ODG can refer to:
 .odg, the file extension for an OpenDocument drawing file
 Ontario Drive and Gear Limited, a former company specializing in amphibious vehicles; now part of ARGO
 Old Dungeon Ghyll, Lake District, England, popular with walkers and climbers
 Objective difference grade, a perceived quality in digital audio
 Olive drab green, a color used in military clothing and equipment
 Overseas Development Group, a fictional UK espionage agency that James Bond works for in Carte Blanche by Jeffery Deaver.